Lampropholis adonis, also known commonly as the diamond shielded sunskink and Ingram's litter skink, is a species of skink, a lizard in the family Scincidae. The species is endemic to Queensland in Australia.

Etymology
The specific name, adonis, refers to the Greek mythological god Adonis.

Habitat
The preferred natural habitats of L. adonis are forest and freshwater wetlands.

Reproduction
L. adonis is oviparous.

References

Further reading
Cogger HG (2014). Reptiles and Amphibians of Australia, Seventh Edition. Clayton, Victoria, Australia: CSIRO Publishing. xxx + 1,033 pp. .
Ingram GJ (1991). "Five new skinks from Queensland rainforests". Memoirs of the Queensland Museum 30 (3): 443–453. (Lampropholis adonis, new species, p. 445).
Wilson S, Swan G (2013). A Complete Guide to Reptiles of Australia, Fourth Edition. Sydney: New Holland Publishers. 522 pp. .

Skinks of Australia
Endemic fauna of Australia
Reptiles described in 1991
Lampropholis
Taxa named by Glen Joseph Ingram